Bulathkohupitiya Divisional Secretariat is a  Divisional Secretariat  of Kegalle District, of Sabaragamuwa Province, Sri Lanka.

References

External link
 Divisional Secretariats Portal

See also
 List of Divisional Secretariats of Sabaragamuwa Province

Divisional Secretariats of Kegalle District